Salisbury is the name of some places in the U.S. state of New York:
Salisbury, Herkimer County, New York, a town
Salisbury (hamlet), Herkimer County, New York, a hamlet 
Salisbury, Nassau County, New York, a census-designated place (CDP)